The 2020 United States House of Representatives elections in Massachusetts was held on November 3, 2020, to elect the nine U.S. representatives from the state of Massachusetts, one from each of the state's nine congressional districts. The elections coincided with the 2020 U.S. presidential election, as well as other elections to the House of Representatives, elections to the United States Senate and various state and local elections. Primary elections were held on September 1.

Overview

District 1

The 1st district is based in the western and central parts of the state, and includes the city of Springfield. The incumbent is Democrat Richard Neal, who was reelected with 97.6% of the vote in 2018 without major-party opposition.

Democratic primary

Candidates

Nominee
 Richard Neal, incumbent U.S. representative

Eliminated in primary
 Alex Morse, mayor of Holyoke

Declined
Tahirah Amatul-Wadud, attorney and candidate for Massachusetts's 1st congressional district in 2018
David Daley, author and former editor-in-chief of Salon

Endorsements

Polling

Primary results

Republican primary

Candidates

Withdrawn
John Cain, businessman and former Navy officer

General election

Predictions

Results

District 2

The 2nd congressional district is in central Massachusetts and includes Worcester. The incumbent is Democrat Jim McGovern, who was reelected with 67.1% of the vote in 2018.

Democratic primary

Candidates

Nominee
 Jim McGovern, incumbent U.S. representative

Primary results

Republican primary

Candidates

Nominee
 Tracy Lovvorn, healthcare operations manager and nominee for Massachusetts's 2nd congressional district in 2018

Primary results

General election

Predictions

Results

District 3

The 3rd district is based in northeastern and central Massachusetts, and includes the cities of Lowell, Lawrence, and Haverhill. The incumbent is Democrat Lori Trahan, who was elected with 62.0% of the vote in 2018.

Democratic primary

Candidates

Nominee
 Lori Trahan, incumbent U.S. representative

Declined
 Dan Koh, Andover selectman, former chief of staff to Boston mayor Marty Walsh, and candidate for Massachusetts's 3rd congressional district in 2018

Endorsements

Primary results

General election

Predictions

Results

District 4

The 4th congressional district is mostly in southern Massachusetts and includes Brookline, the southwestern suburbs of Boston, and northern Bristol County. The incumbent was Democrat Joe Kennedy III, who was reelected with 97.7% of the vote in 2018 without major-party opposition. On September 21, 2019, Kennedy announced that he would not seek reelection, instead challenging incumbent U.S. Senator Ed Markey in the Democratic primary for the 2020 United States Senate election in Massachusetts.

The open seat attracted 12 candidates to file for the primary. On September 4, the Associated Press called the race for Jake Auchincloss, who won with 34,971 votes, a 1.4% margin over Jesse Mermell Auchincloss went on to defeat Republican Julie Hall in the general election.

Democratic primary

Candidates

Nominee
 Jake Auchincloss, Newton city councilor, U.S. Marine veteran, and former Republican political organizer for Governor Charlie Baker's 2014 campaign

Eliminated in primary
 Becky Grossman, Newton city councilor
 Alan Khazei, co-founder and former CEO of City Year and candidate for the U.S. Senate in 2010
 Ihssane Leckey, former Wall Street regulator
 Natalia Linos, epidemiologist and executive director of the FXB Center for Health and Human Rights at Harvard University
 Jesse Mermell, former Brookline select boardmember and former aide to former Governor Deval Patrick 
 Ben Sigel, attorney and former president of the Hispanic National Bar Association

Withdrew
 David Cavell, Assistant Attorney General of Massachusetts and former aide to President Barack Obama (withdrew on August 13 and endorsed Mermell) (remained on ballot)
 Nick Matthew, former public school teacher and nonprofit activist (endorsed Leckey)
 Thomas Shack, former Massachusetts State Comptroller (endorsed Cavell, then Khazei)
 Herb Robinson, engineer
 Chris Zannetos, tech entrepreneur (withdrew on August 26 and endorsed Mermell)(remained on ballot)

Declined
 Chris Dempsey, former policy director for Joe Kennedy III's election campaign in 2012
 Paul Feeney, state senator
 Deb Goldberg, Massachusetts State Treasurer
 Jay Gonzalez, former state secretary of administration and finance and nominee for governor of Massachusetts in 2018
 Patricia Haddad, state representative
 Joe Kennedy III, incumbent U.S. representative (ran for U.S. Senate)
 Scott W. Lang, former mayor of New Bedford
 Marc Pacheco, state senator
 Becca Rausch, state senator
 Tommy Vitolo, state representative
 Setti Warren, former mayor of Newton
 Josh Zakim, former Boston city councilor

Endorsements

Polling

Primary results

Republican primary

Candidates

Nominee
 Julie Hall, former Attleboro city councilor

Eliminated in primary
 David Rosa, U.S. Army veteran

Declined
 Shawn Dooley, state representative
 Shaunna O'Connell, mayor of Taunton and former state representative
 Keiko Orrall, former state representative

Endorsements

Primary results

General election

Predictions

Results

District 5

The 5th congressional district contains Boston's northern and western suburbs, including Malden and Framingham. The incumbent is Democrat Katherine Clark, who was reelected with 75.9% of the vote in 2018.

Democratic primary

Candidates

Nominee
 Katherine Clark, incumbent U.S. representative

Eliminated in primary
 Raffaele DePalma, demographic analyst

Primary results

Republican primary

Candidates

Nominee
 Caroline Colarusso, Stoneham selectwoman

Primary results

General election

Predictions

Results

District 6

The 6th district is based in northeastern Massachusetts, and contains most of Essex County, including the North Shore and Cape Ann. The incumbent is Democrat Seth Moulton, who was reelected with 65.2% of the vote in 2018. Moulton was a candidate for the Democratic presidential primary in 2020, and said that he "has no intention of giving up his seat in the House." He won his district's primary with the most votes ever recorded in a House primary election in Massachusetts history.

Democratic primary

Candidates

Nominee
 Seth Moulton, incumbent U.S. Representative

Eliminated in primary
 Jamie Zahlaway Belsito, Massachusetts PPD commissioner and Salem State University trustee
 Angus McQuilken, gun control advocate

Withdrawn
Lisa Peterson, Salem city councilwoman
 Nathaniel Mulcahy, scientist

Declined
 Kim Driscoll, mayor of Salem
 Lori Ehrlich, state representative
Terrence Kennedy, member of the 6th district of the Massachusetts Governor's Council
 Barbara L'Italien, former state senator and candidate for Massachusetts's 3rd congressional district in 2018
 John F. Tierney, former U.S. representative
 Paul Tucker, state representative

Endorsements

Primary results

Republican primary

Candidates

Nominee
 John Paul Moran, businessman

Primary results

Independents

Candidates

Declared
 Christopher Fisher, carpenter

General election

Predictions

Results

District 7

The 7th district is in eastern Massachusetts, including roughly three-fourths of Boston and a few of its northern and southern suburbs. The incumbent is Democrat Ayanna Pressley, who defeated ten-term incumbent Mike Capuano in the 2018 primary election and ran against write-in votes only in the general election.

Democratic primary

Candidates

Nominee
 Ayanna Pressley, incumbent U.S. Representative

Endorsements

Primary results

Republican primary
In order to qualify for the general election ballot, a write-in candidate must receive at least 2,000 votes.

Candidates

Nominee
 Rayla Campbell (write-in), occupational zoning activist

Eliminated in Primary
 Rachel Miselman (write-in)

Primary results

General election

Predictions

Results

District 8

The 8th district includes South Boston and the southern Boston metro area. The incumbent is Democrat Stephen F. Lynch, who was reelected with 98.4% of the vote in 2018 without major-party opposition.

Democratic primary
In the Democratic primary, lawyer and ten-term incumbent Lynch defeated progressive challenger Robbie Goldstein, a medical doctor with expertise in infectious diseases and transgender healthcare. Several weeks before the primary, the Boston Globe noted the "stark contrast" between the candidates on several key issues, particularly healthcare and police reform. A proponent of Medicare for All, Goldstein ran on a platform of expanding healthcare access during a campaign overshadowed by the COVID-19 pandemic. Lynch, who remains one of only three Democrats in the House who voted against the Affordable Care Act in 2009, advocates reforming the current market-based healthcare system.  In the context of nationwide protests against police brutality and killing of unarmed black citizens, Lynch stated his support for efforts to modify qualified immunity for police officers, while Goldstein advocated ending qualified immunity outright.

Goldstein's campaign also highlighted differences between the two candidates on LGBTQ issues and reproductive rights. In the past, Lynch has identified as pro-life, a position he now deems too extreme.

Several Democratic primary challengers over the years have called Lynch too moderate to serve Massachusetts's electorate. In 2010, Lynch responded, "Calling me the least liberal member from Massachusetts is like calling me the slowest Kenyan in the Boston Marathon. It's all relative.''

Candidates

Nominee
 Stephen F. Lynch, incumbent U.S. representative

Eliminated in primary
 Robbie Goldstein, infectious diseases physician at Massachusetts General Hospital

Withdrawn
 Mohammad Dar, physician (endorsed Goldstein)
 Brianna Wu, video game developer and candidate for Massachusetts's 8th congressional district in 2018

Endorsements

Polling

Primary results

General election

Predictions

Results

District 9

The 9th district encompasses Cape Cod and the South Shore, and extends westward into New Bedford, part of Fall River, and surrounding suburbs. The incumbent is Democrat Bill Keating, who was reelected with 59.4% of the vote in 2018.

Democratic primary

Candidates

Nominee
 Bill Keating, incumbent U.S. representative

Withdrawn
 Mark Sylvia, former undersecretary for the Massachusetts Executive Office of Energy and Environmental Affairs

Declined
 Joe Rull, Norwell town selectman

Primary results

Republican primary

Candidates

Nominee
 Helen Brady, nominee for Massachusetts State Auditor in 2018

Primary results

General election

Predictions

Results

See also
 2020 Massachusetts general election

Notes

Partisan clients

References

External links
 
 
  (State affiliate of the U.S. League of Women Voters)
 

Official campaign websites for 1st district candidates
 Richard Neal (D) for Congress

Official campaign websites for 2nd district candidates
 Tracy Lovvorn (R) for Congress
 Jim McGovern (D) for Congress

Official campaign websites for 3rd district candidates
 Lori Trahan (D) for Congress

Official campaign websites for 4th district candidates
 Jake Auchincloss (D) for Congress
 Julie Hall (R) for Congress

Official campaign websites for 5th district candidates
 Katherine Clark (D) for Congress
 Caroline Colarusso (R) for Congress

Official campaign websites for 6th district candidates
 John Paul Moran (R) for Congress
 Seth Moulton (D) for Congress

Official campaign websites for 7th district candidates
 Rayla Campbell (R) for Congress 
 Ayanna Pressley (D) for Congress

Official campaign websites for 8th district candidates
 Stephen F. Lynch (D) for Congress

Official campaign websites for 9th district candidates
 Helen Brady (R) for Congress 
 Bill Keating (D) for Congress

2020
United States House of Representatives
Massachusetts